Aankhen is a 1993 Indian Hindi-language action comedy film directed by David Dhawan and written by Anees Bazmee. It stars Govinda in a dual role and Chunky Pandey. It was a blockbuster at the box office and the highest-grossing Indian film of 1993. It was  remade in Telugu as Pokiri Raja (1995).

The movie was reported to have been inspired by the 1977 Kannada movie Kittu Puttu  which itself was inspired by the 1967 Tamil movie Anubavi Raja Anubavi which had earlier been remade in Hindi in 1973 as Do Phool.It is Also adapted from Marathi film Changu- Mangu released in 1990.

At the 39th Filmfare Awards, the film received 4 nominations - Best Film, Best Director (Dhawan), Best Actor (Govinda) and Best Comedian (Khan), but failed to win in any category.

Synopsis
Hasmukh Rai (Kader Khan) has a problem. As a matter of fact, two problems — his two sons: Munnu (Chunky Pandey) and Gulshan "Bunnu" (Govinda Ahuja). The brothers are notorious slackers up to no good, and involved in elaborate practical jokes. It comes to Hasmukh's attention that his sons have been lying to him about their college grades — in studies and sports — and have not been attending school for the last three years. As a result, they are kicked out of college and, ultimately, their home. Later, one of their practical jokes gets out of hand, and Bunnu disappears, presumed dead. Munnu gets involved in the conspiracy of killing Bunnu. Meanwhile, from a small Indian village, Bunnu's identical cousin, Gauri Shankar, arrives in town. He is mistaken for Bunnu which leads to hilarious misunderstandings and constant uproar.

Reception
The movie was 1993's biggest Bollywood hit and ran in the theaters for 12 weeks. The domestic distribution share was  against a  budget.

Aankhen was responsible for jump-starting or re-energizing the careers of a few actors. Govinda, for example, struggling at the time, spawned a number of comedy hits such as Raja Babu, Coolie No. 1, and Saajan Chale Sasural, after the commercial success of Aankhen. Although he starred in hits like Hatya (1988), Swarg (1990), and Shola aur Shabnam (1992), his double role in Aankhen established him as the "Comedy King of Bollywood" at that time. One of the lead heroines of the movie, Raageshwari Loomba started singing later. Govinda's double role was a highlight from this cinema

Cast
Govinda as Bunnu / Gaurishankar (dual role)
Chunky Pandey as Munnu
Ritu Shivpuri as Ritu
Raageshwari as Priya Mohan
Shilpa Shirodkar as Chandramukhi
Bindu as Anuradha
Harish Patel as Monto (Hired Principal / Hired father / Hired Thief
Shakti Kapoor as The Main Antagonist, Tejeshwar
Mahavir Shah as Pravin Shah
Gulshan Grover as Natwar Shah
Raza Murad as D.C.P
Mac Mohan as Tejeshwar's henchman
Sudhir as Tejeshwar's henchman
Gavin Packard as Tejeshwar's henchman, Man Shot Mistakenly for Bunnu.
Dina Pathak as grandmother
Vikas Anand as Distinguished Doctor
Govind Namdeo as Distinguished Doctor
Kader Khan as Hasmukh Rai
Raj Babbar as Chief Minister / Sarang (dual role)
Sadashiv Amrapurkar as Inspector Pyare Mohan
Arun Bakshi as a Man who saved Bunnu
Rakesh Bedi as Gulshan Kapoor "Gullu"
Bob Christo as Tejeshwar's henchman
Neena Gupta as Chief Minister's wife
Kamaldeep as St. Xavier's Principal
Manmauji as Baba
Guddi Maruti as Chabia
Yunus Parvez as Seth Sukhiram
Kedarnath Saigal as Judge

Soundtrack
The lyrics were written by Indeevar. The songs are as follows:

Accolades 
39th Filmfare Awards:

References

External links
 

1993 films
1990s Hindi-language films
Films directed by David Dhawan
Films scored by Bappi Lahiri
1993 action comedy films
Indian action comedy films
Hindi-language action films
Films about monkeys
Films about pets
Hindi films remade in other languages